Francis Giraud (4 July 1932 – 23 October 2010) was a French physician.

1932 births
2010 deaths
20th-century French physicians
Officiers of the Légion d'honneur
Physicians from Marseille
Rally for the Republic politicians
Union for a Popular Movement politicians
Articles needing translation from French Wikipedia
Senators of Bouches-du-Rhône